Thendral Vanthu Ennai Thodum  trans. (The Breeze Will Come and Touch Me) is an Indian Tamil language television series that premiered on Star Vijay and streams on Disney+ Hotstar. It is the remake of the television series Khelaghor, which is aired on Star Jalsha.

Plot
The story starts with an educated woman Abhinaya maintains her traditions. She meets Vetri, a village goon who isn't aware of the importance of marriage procedures, when she helps a couple get married in the temple. A samiyar encounters her and appears one day and predicts that Abhinaya will wed an rogue, whether they had previously given it any credence. Abhi was attempting to help a couple who had secretly wed. Before leaving, Vetri pulls a mangala sutra (thaali) and fastens it around Abhi's neck after giving him a slap where Vetri. He later regrets it, though. To the dismay of her father and Vetri, Abhinaya was forcibly ushered into the slum as a newlywed bride despite her first astonishment and anguish. Vetri dismisses Abi's attempts to help him comprehend the meaning of love. But Abhinaya discovers the truth about Vetri and the reasons behind his abrupt change, as well as the fact that Radha, a lifelong acquaintance, is secretly in love with him. However, destiny causes several things to happen in the lives of Vetri and Abhinaya that finally lead to the two of them becoming close. Additionally, Vetri mentions that he likes Abhinaya in the scene where she was taken away.  Finally, Vetri and Abhinaya are forbidden from entering the house. However, Vetri's other family members agreed to let them live with them on the terrace next to their house. Will Vetri and Abhinaya be acknowledged as a couple and live jointly.
 Whether the two can settle their differences and unite forms the remainder of the story.

Cast

Main cast
 Pavithra Janani as Abhinaya "Abi" Vetriselvan, Vetri's wife and the eldest daughter of Judge Sankaranarayanan and Padma
 Vinoth Babu as Vetriselvan "Vetri" Aranganathan, Abi's husband and the youngest son of Aranganathan and Kamala 
 Sudar Sam as Sudar, Abi’s and Vetri’s daughter

Supporting roles
 Shaurya Shashank Ramesh in a dual role as 
 Bhavani, Poongavanam's nephew (Antagonist) (2022) (dead)
 Parameswaran "Parama", Bhavani's identical twin brother, Radha's husband (Main Antagonist) (2022–present)
 Supergood Kannan as Poongavanam, a local politician and Vetri's mentor turned enemy (Antagonist) (2021–2023) (dead)
 Tharshika as Radha, Vetri's ex-fiancé and Parama's wife (Antagonist) (2021–present)
 L. Raja as Aranganathan (Ranga), Vetri, Kalai and Anbu's father (2021–2023) (dead)
 Priya as Kamala Aranganathan, Aranganathan's wife and Vetri, Kalai and Anbu's mother (2021–present)
 Sathya Sudha as Kalaiselvan "Kalai", Vetri and Anbu's elder brother (2021–present)
 Raj Kumar Manoharan as Anbuselvan "Anbu", Vetri's elder brother and Kalai's younger brother (2021–present)
 Remyaa Joseph as Nandhini, Kalai's wife and Vetri's eldest sister-in-law (2021–present)
 Syamantha Kiran as Chithra, Anbu's wife and Vetri's second sister-in-law (Antagonist) (2021–present) 
 Auditor Sridhar as Judge Sankaranaryanan, Abhinaya's father (2021–present)
 J.Lalitha as Padma, Abi's Mother (2021–2023) (dead)
 Maria Juliana as Kanmani (2023-present)
 Krithika Laddu as Viji (2023-present)
 Anjali Varadharajan as Sivagami, Abi's Aunt. (2021–present)
 Shravnitha srikanth as Deepthi, Abhinaya's sister.(2021–present)
 Dev Anand Sharma as Suriya, Abhinaya's cousin, Sivagami Son, Sankaranarayanan and Padma's nephew.(Antagonist) (2021–present)
 Bharani Elangovan as Varsha, Suriya's wife, Tharshan Sister. (Antagonist)(2021–present)
 Krishna Kishore (2021) / Manoj Kumar (2022–present) as Tharshan, Abi's fiancé, lawyer
 Vasu Vikram as Chidhambaram, Varsha and Tharshan's father (Antagonist)
 Rekha Suresh as Chandra, Tharshan's Mother
 Gowthami Vembunathan as Radha's mother
 Kausalya Senthamarai (2021) / S. N. Parvathy (2022) as Vetri's grandmother.
 Premalatha as Poongavanam Wife
 Dhanasekar as Gopalkrishna, Vetri's 'chittappa' and fellow henchman.
 Paranthaman as Quarter, one of Vetri's henchmen
 Krishna Kumar as Pei (Peiathevan), one of Vetri's henchmen
 VJ Vishal as Shakthi, Vetri's childhood friend, Abi's cousin (2022)

Controversy
In the preview of this series, Vetri, the protagonist, argues that the love marriage against his parents is invalid. Then the heroine Abhinaya comes to stop him. In anger he takes the thali from Amman's neck and puts it on Abhi's neck. Just tying a yellow rope is enough. "Now I will be your husband," he says angrily. Not only many feminists have seen this scene, but there has been widespread criticism from all sides in this serial.

Crossovers
There was a crossover with Namma Veettu Ponnu from 15 November 2021 to 27 November 2021.

Adaptations

References

External links
 
 Thendral Vanthu Ennai Thodum at Hotstar

Star Vijay original programming
Tamil-language melodrama television series
Tamil-language romance television series
2021 Tamil-language television series debuts
Tamil-language television series based on Bengali-languages television series
Tamil-language television soap operas
Television shows set in Tamil Nadu